Marcos Vinícius Sousa Natividade (born 26 January 1997), known as Marquinhos, is a Brazilian professional footballer who plays as a winger for Cypriot First Division club APOEL.

Club career
Born in Benevides, Pará, Marquinhos began his career with local side Castanhal. He then enjoyed youth spells at Santos, Noroeste and Portuguesa before joining Corinthians in 2014. Initially having little playing time, he was loaned to Flamengo-SP before returning in 2017 and establishing himself with the under-20s.

On 2 March 2018, after finishing his formation, Marquinhos was loaned to Bangu for the 2018 Campeonato Carioca. He made his debut for the club the following day, starting in a 1–1 home draw against Portuguesa-RJ.

Rarely used at Bangu, Marquinhos moved to Bragantino in the Série C on 1 May 2018, also in a temporary deal. He became a regular starter for the club, helping in their promotion to Série B before returning to Timão for the 2019 campaign.

On 13 May 2019, Marquinhos was loaned to Ponte Preta until December. The following 1 January, after playing regularly, he agreed to a one-year loan deal with Sport Recife in the Série A; he also renewed his contract with his parent club until December 2022.

Marquinhos made his top tier debut on 8 August 2020, starting in a 3–2 home win against Ceará. He scored his first goal in the category on 6 September, netting the winner in a 2–1 home success over Goiás.

Career statistics

References

External links
Sport Recife profile 

1997 births
Living people
Sportspeople from Pará
Brazilian footballers
Association football forwards
Campeonato Brasileiro Série A players
Campeonato Brasileiro Série B players
Campeonato Brasileiro Série C players
Sport Club Corinthians Paulista players
Bangu Atlético Clube players
Clube Atlético Bragantino players
Associação Atlética Ponte Preta players
Sport Club do Recife players